Bejam was a British frozen food retailer founded by John Apthorp in 1968, based in Stanmore.

History
The concept of selling only frozen foods was a novel idea in 1968, and Bejam grew out of Apthorp's existing family business of E. A. D. Apthorp, potato merchants who delivered in and around Edgware and Stanmore. Bejam also sold electrical appliances with the Bejam brand name, including freezers, refrigerators, microwave ovens and dishwashers.

Bejam was named after the family's beach hut whose name was an acronym for Brian, Eric, John and Milly and Marion, the names of the Apthorp family members. 

Bejam bought the Victor Value chain of supermarkets from Tesco in 1986 and Wizard Wine in 1987. 

In January 1989, Bejam was bought by its rival Iceland, despite still being a success and being three times bigger than the Iceland chain. The shops were rebranded to carry the "Iceland" name.

See also
List of companies based in London

References

Bibliography
 Adrian Room, Corporate Eponymy: A Biographical Dictionary of the Persons Behind the Names, Page 17, McFarland & Co, 1992, 
 Adrian Room, Dictionary of Trade Name Origins, Page 38, Routledge, 1982, 
 David Boylan, Antony Head, Corporate Finance: Principles & Practice, Page 314, Pearson Education, 2007, 

Retail companies established in 1968
Companies disestablished in 1989
Companies based in the London Borough of Harrow
Defunct supermarkets of the United Kingdom
1968 establishments in the United Kingdom
1989 disestablishments in the United Kingdom